Mahuidacursor (meaning "mountain runner",  meaning "mountain" in Mapudungun) is a genus of basal ornithopod dinosaur from the Santonian Bajo de la Carpa Formation of the Neuquén Basin in northern Patagonia, Argentina. The type and only species is M. lipanglef.

References 

Ornithopods
Santonian life
Late Cretaceous dinosaurs of South America
Cretaceous Argentina
Fossils of Argentina
Bajo de la Carpa Formation
Fossil taxa described in 2019
Ornithischian genera